Chihuahuan meadowlark (Sturnella lilianae), also known as Lilian's meadowlark, is a bird in the family Icteridae. It is found in northern Mexico and the southwestern portion of the United States. It was formerly usually treated as a subspecies of the eastern meadowlark (Sturnella magna).

Taxonomy
The Chihuahuan meadowlark was formally described in 1930 by the American ornithologist Harry C. Oberholser as a subspecies of the eastern meadowlark based on a holotype that had been collected in the Huachuca Mountains of Arizona. Oberholser proposed the trinomial name Sturnella magna lilianae. The epithet lilianae was chosen to honor Lilian Hanna Baldwin (wife of ornithologist Samuel Prentiss Baldwin). It is now treated as a separate species based on the significant morphological, vocal and genomic differences between the Chihuahuan meadowlark and the other subspecies of the eastern meadowlark.

Two subspecies are recognised:
 Sturnella lilianae lilianae Oberholser, 1930 – southwest USA and northwest Mexico (Chihuahuan Desert)
 Sturnella lilianae auropectoralis Saunders, GB, 1934 – west-central Mexico

References

Sturnella
Birds described in 1930
Taxa named by Harry C. Oberholser
Taxonomy articles created by Polbot